Rose emma Cherukut is a Ugandan politician and legislator. She represents the people of Kween district as district woman MP in the parliament of Uganda. She is a member of National Resistance Movement (NRM) a party under the chairmanship of Yoweri Kaguta Museveni president of the republic of Uganda.

Career 
Cherukut is a former Resident District Commissioner (RDC) for Kapchorwa district. She came to parliament after winning the MP seat with 19,479 votes against Chekwel Lydia who garnered 13,550 votes. Cherukut is a niece to Lydia Chekwel whom she defeated. Chekwel is married to Cherut's uncle.

In the parliament of Uganda, Cherukut is a member on the committee on legal and parliamentary affairs. She is also a member on the Committee on Public Accounts (Local Government).

Controversy 
Cherukut was accused of high handedness when one of her body guards while she was still RDC in Kapchorwa shot dead a 14 year old lady while trying to disperse drunkards who had violated Covid 19 curfew rules.

References 

Women members of the Parliament of Uganda
Members of the Parliament of Uganda
21st-century Ugandan women politicians
21st-century Ugandan politicians
National Resistance Movement politicians
Year of birth missing (living people)
Living people